Tran Quoc An may refer to:

 Trần Quốc Ân (active 1940s) Vietnamese painter, at the Hanoi Art School
 Trần Quốc Ẩn (born 1961) Vietnamese calligrapher notable for making giant size books